Nigel Warburton (born 1962) is a British philosopher. He is best known as a populariser of philosophy, having written a number of books in the genre, but he has also written academic works in aesthetics and applied ethics.

Education
Warburton received a BA from the University of Bristol and a PhD from Darwin College, Cambridge, and was a lecturer at the University of Nottingham before joining the Department of Philosophy at the Open University in 1994. In May 2013, he resigned from the position of Senior Lecturer at the Open University.

Career
He is the author of a number of introductory Philosophy books, including the bestselling Philosophy: The Basics (4th ed.), Philosophy: The Classics (4th ed.), and Thinking from A to Z (3rd ed.); he also edited Philosophy: Basic Readings (2nd ed.) and was the co-author of Reading Political Philosophy: Machiavelli to Mill. He has written extensively about photography, particularly about Bill Brandt, and wrote a biography of the modernist architect Ernő Goldfinger. He writes a weekly column "Everyday Philosophy" for The New European newspaper.

He runs a philosophy weblog Virtual Philosopher and with David Edmonds regularly podcasts interviews with top philosophers on a range of subjects at Philosophy Bites. He also podcasts chapters from his book Philosophy: The Classics. He has written for the Guardian newspaper.

Partial bibliography 
Philosophy: The Basics (4th ed.) 
Philosophy: The Classics (4th ed.) 
Thinking from A to Z (3rd ed.) 
The Art Question 
Ernö Goldfinger: The Life of An Architect
Free Speech: A Very Short Introduction 
Philosophy Bites (co-edited with David Edmonds) ; Philosophy Bites. 25 Philosophen sprechen über 25 große Themen (translated by Holger Hanowell), Reclam 2013
 Philosophy Bites Back (co-edited with David Edmonds) ; Auf den Schultern von Riesen. 27 Philosophen sprechen über ihre Lieblingsphilosophen (translated by Holger Hanowell), Reclam 2015
A Little History of Philosophy 
Hope: A New Beginning (An A. Gąsiewski Biography)

References

External links

Official site

1962 births
Living people
Academics of the Open University
English book editors
British political philosophers
Philosophy writers
Alumni of Darwin College, Cambridge
Alumni of the University of Bristol
Academics of the University of Nottingham
Historians of philosophy
British republicans